The Red Cloud is an early painting by the Dutch artist Piet Mondrian. It was painted in 1907.  Mondrian completed the painting while staying near Oele, in the east of the Netherlands. One art historian has noted that the "hard colour contrasts and charged, expressive brushwork" is part of Mondrian's evolution towards an abstract painter. 

The artwork is part of the collection of the Kunstmuseum Den Haag, in The Hague. It was acquired by the museum in 1956, as a gift from Albert Pieter van den Briel, who had owned the painting since 1908.

References

Modern paintings
De Stijl
1907 paintings
Paintings by Piet Mondrian
Collections of the Kunstmuseum, The Hague